Frederick G. Beckner Jr. (March 1, 1916 – September 27, 1970) was an American character actor born in California. He was known for playing Pony Deal in the American western television series The Life and Legend of Wyatt Earp, which starred Hugh O'Brian. Coby was also known for playing Cady in the 1951 serial film Government Agents vs. Phantom Legion. He played as Tony Montgomery in the legal drama television series Perry Mason episode, "The Case of the Grumbling Grandfather".. 

In 1966 he appeared in an episode of Gunsmoke entitled, “Moonstone”, as an outlaw wanted for robbery (“Rankin”).

Partial filmography 

 The Cross of Lorraine (1943) - French Soldier (uncredited)
 Girl Crazy (1943) - Radio Man (uncredited)
 Lost Angel (1943) - Bit Role (uncredited)
 A Guy Named Joe (1943) - Cadet (uncredited)
 Two Girls and a Sailor (1944) - Sailor (uncredited)
 Meet the People (1944) - Marine (uncredited)
 Marriage Is a Private Affair (1944) - Roger Poole (uncredited)
 They Were Expendable (1945) - Officer at Airport (uncredited)
 The Scarlet Horseman (1946) - Tioga
 Without Reservations (1946) - French Officer (uncredited)
 The Brute Man (1946) - Young Hal Moffat
 Don Ricardo Returns (1946) - Don Ricardo
 Sweethearts of Sigma Chi (1946) - Bill Ryan
 Lady Chaser (1946) - Role (uncredited)
 Unconquered (1947) - Royal American Soldier (uncredited)
 The Prairie (1947) - Abner Bush
 Devil's Cargo (1948) - Fred
 The Counterfeiters (1948) - Piper
 Jungle Goddess (1948) - Pilot
 Walk a Crooked Mile (1948) - Fred (FBI Chemist) (uncredited)
 The Three Musketeers (1948) - Musketeer (uncredited)
 The Man from Colorado (1948) - Veteran (uncredited)
 Ride, Ryder, Ride! (1949) - Henry W. Iverson
 State Department: File 649 (1949) - Vice Consul (uncredited)
 White Heat (1949) - Happy Taylor (uncredited)
 The Great Jewel Robber (1950) - Tom Colt (Convict) (uncredited)
 Halls of Montezuma (1951) - Capt. McCreavy (uncredited)
 Government Agents vs. Phantom Legion (1951) - Cady
 The Mob (1951) - Plainclothesman (uncredited)
 Bronco Buster (1952) - Doctor (uncredited)
 Pat and Mike (1952) - Trooper (uncredited)
 Scarlet Angel (1952) - Soldier (uncredited)
 My Man and I (1952) - Detective (uncredited)
 Horizons West (1952) - Townsman (uncredited)
 Above and Beyond (1952) - Guard (uncredited)
 The Man from the Alamo (1953) - Soldier (uncredited)
 Devil's Canyon (1953) - Cole Gorman (uncredited)
 Crime Wave (1954) - Cop in Squad Car (uncredited)
 A Bullet for Joey (1955) - Radio Man (uncredited)
 Illegal (1955) - Prison Guard (uncredited)
 D-Day the Sixth of June (1956) - Medic (uncredited)
 Dakota Incident (1956) - Townsman (uncredited)
 The Ten Commandments (1956) - Tackmaster/Hebrew at Golden Calf (uncredited)
 The Great American Pastime (1956) - Man in Stands (uncredited)
 The Night the World Exploded (1957) - Ranger Brown
 My Man Godfrey (1957) - Investigator
 Jailhouse Rock (1957) - Jerry the Bartender (uncredited)
 Death Valley Days (1957) - Captain Absalom Austin Townsend (episode "Rough and Ready")
 No Time for Sergeants (1958) - Sentry (uncredited)
 The Law and Jake Wade (1958) - Deputy (uncredited)
 Onionhead (1958) - Coast Guard Recruiting Officer (uncredited)
 Last Train from Gun Hill (1959) - Luke (uncredited)
 Platinum High School (1960) - Officer (uncredited)
 The Adventures of Huckleberry Finn (1960) - Sheriff (uncredited)
 Key Witness (1960) - Policeman (uncredited)
 Cimarron (1960) - Oil Worker (uncredited)
 Ada (1961) - Reporter (uncredited)
 Experiment in Terror (1962) - FBI Agent (uncredited)
 Billy Rose's Jumbo (1962) - Andy (uncredited)

References

External links 

Rotten Tomatoes profile

1916 births
1970 deaths
Place of death missing
Male actors from California
American male film actors
American male television actors
20th-century American male actors
Western (genre) television actors